Pachystola erinacea is a species of beetle in the family Cerambycidae. It was described by Karl Jordan in 1894. It is found in Tanzania, Malawi, the Democratic Republic of the Congo, South Africa, Kenya, Zambia, Cameroon, and Zimbabwe.

References

Pachystolini
Beetles described in 1894